Gor Mahia Football Club, commonly also known as , is a football club based in Nairobi, Kenya. They have won the Kenyan Premier League a record 19 times, and have also won the FKF President's Cup a record 11 times. They are the only team from Kenya to win an African continental title to date, having won the African Cup Winners' Cup in 1987 after previously reaching the final in 1979.

The club was formally established on 17 February 1968 as a merger of Luo Union and Luo Sports Club (also known as Luo Stars) and won the national league at the first time of asking. Some of its original leaders were politicians Tom Mboya and Jaramogi Oginga Odinga. However the club was founded much earlier, in the 1915, and participated intermittently in local tournaments in Western Kenya. Various groups used this name at different times.

The club plays its home games at the Nairobi City Stadium. Alternatively they also play their home games at the Moi International Sports Centre and the Nyayo National Stadium. It has been proposed that the club hosts some of its home matches at its alternate stadiums in its earlier days, the Kisumu County Stadium and the Mombasa Municipal Stadium.

The club won the Kenya National Football league in 1968, having been formally founded only in February of the same year. In 1976, Gor Mahia won the national league unbeaten, and repeated the same feat 39 years later under the leadership of Frank Nuttall.

Towards the end of the 2000s, Gor started bouncing back to fame steadily bringing Kenyan football fans back to the pitch and regularly filling sold-out stadiums. The club returned to silverware in 2008 when it won the KFF Cup after a thirteen-year drought of any major trophies. Gor proceeded to win the Kenya DSTV Super Cup against the year's defending champs, Mathare United before the beginning of the 2009 KPL season.
On 26 October 2011 Gor Mahia in typically dominant fashion trounced Sofapaka to win the 2011 edition of the FKL Cup having dispatched their archrivals AFC Leopards 6 days earlier in a 20 October Heroes Day thriller.

History

Formation
Gor Mahia Football Club was formally established on 17 February 1968 after the merging of Luo Union and Luo Sports Club. The club was named after a legendary medicineman from Kanyamwa, Ndhiwa, Homa Bay in Luo mythology, whose nickname was Gor Mahia ("mahia" is Luo for "magic") because he was famous for performing magic. The club's most famous nickname, K'Ogalo, also stems from the medicineman, whose full name was Gor Wuod Ogada nyakwar Ogalo (Gor son of Ogada grandson of Ogalo), and as such was known as Gor Makogalo, or Gor K'Ogalo in short, which means "Gor of Ogalo's homestead".

Several prominent Luos from all walks of life met in Nairobi to christen the club.  The name Gor Mahia was settled upon from a shortlist of other Luo cultural heroes and warriors such as: Nyathi Kwach; Lwanda Magere from Kano; Okore wuod Ogonda Mumbo from Kisumu; Ogutu wuod Kipapi from Ugenya; Kech Kamajwala from Asembo and Tao K'Ogot also from Ugenya.

1970s
Gor Mahia won the league title in their inaugural season in 1968 with legendary Kenya striker William Ouma "Chege" scoring 19 goals. They would win the league title for the second time in 1974. In 1976, Gor Mahia became the first Kenyan football club to win the National League unbeaten thanks to the exploits of playmaker Allan Thigo who also acted as coach. He was ably assisted by stars such as Festus Nyakota, James Ogolla and new recruits Jerry Imbo who had been recruited from Black Mamba and legendary goalpoacher Maurice Ochieng who had been recruited from Kenya Police. Goalkeeper George Ayuka was in sensational form throughout the season. Maurice Ochieng finished as leading scorer in the league with 18 goals, ahead of the legendary William "Chege" Ouma who scored 16. The 1976 is one of the strongest the club had ever fielded. It included such stars as Masanta Osoro, Paul "Cobra" Oduwa, Festus Nyakota, Duncan Aluko and Duncan Migan, all of whom played for the national team at one point. Current Roads Minister in the Kenyan Cabinet Chris Obure also played for Gor in their inaugural season in 1968 and 1969.

In the 1979 African Cup Winners' Cup final, Gor Mahia faced Canon Yaounde of Cameroun, the defending champions. Over confidence played a part in Gor Mahia losing the 1st leg 0–2. Lack of experience took its toll as Gor Mahia inexplicably lost the second league 0–6. There were unconfirmed rumours that some players had been bribed.

1980s
Gor Mahia beat AFC Leopards 1–0 to win the 1983 league and at the end of the match, President Moi presented the league to captain Peter Otieno Bassanga.

Gor Mahia won the inaugural Moi Golden Cup by beating Bandari 1–0 in the final. An injury time goal by Hezborn Omollo secured the victory at Nyayo stadium. The tough Bandari outfit coached by Mohammed Kheri was at the time playing in the Coast Provincial League. Winning the Moi Golden Cup enabled Gor Mahia to participate in the 1987 Africa Cup Winners Cup.

In 1989 K'Ogalo retained the Moi Golden Cup for the 3rd successive year by beating Kenya Breweries 2–0 in the final. After the match, Abass Magongo who was man of the match was carried shoulder high by fans. Gor Mahia however lost the league title to a resurgent AFC Leopards who benefited from their recruiting spree and sponsorship from Crown Paints Kenya. Having won the Moi Golden Cup the previous year, Gor Mahia were back in the Cup winners Cup in 1989. In the 1st round they received a walkover when Villa of Uganda pulled out. In round 2 they beat Costa Do Sol of Mozambique 2–1 at home and tied them 0–0 away. In the quarter finals they faced LPRC Oilers of Liberia. The 1st leg was played at Nyayo stadium. Gor Mahia played a disjointed game and the game ended 0–0. By this time, After the match, Liberian players celebrated as if they had won a Cup final. Gor Mahia team manager told the media that K'Ogalo would conquer the return leg. Indeed, they did, winning 3–1 in Monrovia. Coach Mohammed Kheri had been drafted from Bandari on a temporary basis to replace Johnson. In the semis they faced El Merreikh of Sudan. After winning the 1st leg 1–0, they lost 0–2 in the return leg in Omdurman. So Gor Mahia bowed out in the semi-final.

1990s

1996 was the most disastrous year in the club's history. The club was eliminated in the 1st round of the Africa champions league by Zimbabwean outfit, Dynamos, leading to one of the worst riots ever seen in Nairobi. In the League they finished 8th which was unprecedented in the club's history. In 1997, the club recovered and almost won the National League, only losing by goal difference to eventual winners, Utalii. Among the players who were instrumental in that campaign were Victor Onyango in goal; Josiah Ougo and Tillen Oguta in defence; Frazier Ochieng and Dan Ogada in midfield and Bonaventure Maruti, Steve Okumu and Steve Odiaga in attack. The club was unable to hold on to these superb players, many of whom left for various destinations including the Middle East. The last two years of the 20th century were characterised by inconsistent performances by the club mainly due to lack of finances. Because the club was flat broke they were unable to hire a qualified professional coach, Additionally the club has been unable to retain its quality players most of whom left after a short period for greener pastures.

2000s
At one point, the club refused to pay a KPL imposed fine. However, KPL managing director received full payment of the Gor Mahia penalty from an anonymous "senior official of another KPL club" who wrote in an unsigned letter that "it is deeply disappointing that a few colleagues who are senior Gor Mahia officials refuse to respect the KPL policy against assaults on referees which their representative approved in February. Their refusal to respect the rules also saddens me because it is not those officials but their own players who are suffering the most after playing so well this year. Out of respect and sympathy for the Gor Mahia players, I enclose full payment of Ksh 45,063 so they can resume playing."

2010s
From a financial perspective, 2011 was a landmark year because that was the year that Gor Mahia secured their first ever legitimate shirt sponsorship. Previously in 1991, Gor Mahia wore shirts emblazoned International Casino. However the proceeds from that sponsorship are unknown and clouded in mystery. The KSh.38 million/= Tuzo sponsorship by Spin Knit Dairy was the most lucrative by any club in Kenya when announced. Gor Mahia went on to win the FKL Cup and finish fourth in the league.

At the beginning of the season, the club acquired Moses Odhiambo, a former international who had played in Tanzanian and Rwandese leagues and he proved to be a revelation. Teenage striker Edwin Lavatsa was also a big hit in his first season in the KPL. After strong performances in mid-season, the steam run out and Gor finished 4th in the league, largely due to disharmony in the technical bench and overcommitment of head coach Zedekiah Otieno to the Kenya national team. In Otieno's absence, Cameroonian assistant coach Anaba Awono led the club to win the FKL Cup after beating bitter rivals A.F.C. Leopards in the semis, and then edging out Sofapaka in the final. The club also conducted its elections towards the end of November and brought in many youthful officials.

Gor Mahia started the 2012 season in high tempo after attending the traditional Nyanza tour to meet fans and recruit more players from the fanatical homeland. The tour itself was a gruelling 6-day affair where the team played 9 matches, winning 7 and drawing two.

The club went on a signing spree in preparation for the 2012 CAF Confederation Cup, bringing in more than 10 players. Baldwin Ngwa and Ibrahim Kitawi rejoined the squad Soccer pundits and fans had cautiously termed this as one of the strongest squads ever in decades at the club. However, this was not to be, as the club, despite a winning start against Thika United in the league on 12 February 2012, went on to lose 3–0 away to debutants Muhoroni Youth and 1–0 at home to Ferroviário de Maputo of Mozambique in the first hurdle of the Confederation Cup. These matches coupled with the Super Cup loss to Tusker and another league loss to Karuturi Sports led to the disbandment of the entire technical team led by Awono. Others shown the door included assistant coach Ken Odhiambo, team manager Jolawi Obondo, coach Julius Owino and fitness coach Zablon Otieno.

The 2013 season saw Gor Mahia clinch their first league title in 18 years, under the leadership of goalkeeper Jerim Onyango and coach Bobby Williamson. On the way to a record 13th title, fans of the club popularised the phrase "Giniwasekao" around the country, which is Luo for "we have taken this thing".

Gor Mahia players further added to the club's mystique by finishing their Sportspesa Premier League fixtures for 2015 season unbeaten, under Head Coach Frank Nuttall

Top Scorers

Data compiled by K'Ogalo Pundit indicates that the club's top all-time goal scorer is Sammy Onyango 'Jogoo' who scored 92 goals in all competitive matches for the club. He is also the club's leading all-time scorer in the league competition with 79 goals. Sammy Onyango joined Gor Mahia from Hakati Sportiff in 1981 and played for the club till 1989 before seeing out his career at Kisumu Posta. He is followed by Allan Thigo with 88 goals (66 league goals) and Hesbon Omollo with 84 goals (75 league goals).

Peter Dawo is the club's all-time scorer in contentinental competitions with 14 goals followed by Andrew Obunga with 7 goals and Allan Thigo with 6 goals

Managerial history

Jack Johnson

Jack Johnson was appointed Gor Mahia manager in 1987.

John Bobby Ogolla

A caretaker coach, former captain and all-time legend Bobby Ogolla, took the position of head coach, assisted by Technical manager Tom Ogweno (a former Kenya national striker and Ulinzi Stars player) and was immediately thrust into tough fixtures against Tusker and A.F.C. Leopards. The team gave a very good account of themselves in both games despite losing 2–0 to the former and drawing 0–0 against the in-form Leopards in a match marred by crowd trouble.

In the next matches, Gor drew 1–1 with Rangers and 0–0 with Sony as Ogolla tried to steady the ship from sinking.

Zdravko Logarušić
In April 2012, Croatian tactician Zdravko Logarušić was drafted as head coach.
Bobby Ogolla, ever the gentleman, accepted to deputise. The first match for the pair ended in 1–1 with Mathare United, followed by a 0–1 loss to Oserian FC, a win against Sofapaka and a loss against Ulinzi in late April. This was the last loss for the club this year in any match. From there the club has won 7 out 8 KPL matches against Nairobi City Stars, Chemelil FC, KCB FC, Western stima – by doing the double in both legs except for a 1st leg fixtures ender draw against Stima. On 12 August, the club is number 6th on the log after languishing in relegation places in the first two months of the 2012 league. The club also has qualified for the KPL Top 8 tourney final against Ulinzi after dispatching Tusker in both legs of the semi-final. This after, getting a walkover in the quartes against AFC Leopards who 'feared' showing up on matchday, giving a myriad of excuses.

Gor Mahia also qualified for the next round of the FKF Cup (the domestic title) after dispatching Borabu Chiefs 5–2 and are in contention for a treble. This success is attributed to the good working synergy in the technical bench, a tough fitness regime introduced by a Finnish expert, acquisition of a professional goalkeeper coach but mostly to the excellent field combination of the team's players. The technical bench has revamped and reorganised the playing unit to create a potent force within just a few months.

After failing to return on time from holiday, Logarušić was sacked with immediate effect on 25 June 2013, and replaced by former Uganda national team manager Bobby Williamson 9 days later, on 5 July 2013.

Bobby Williamson
Bobby Williamson's managerial debut came in a league match against Sugar FC on 17 July 2013. He left the club in September 2014, being replaced by Frank Nuttall, whom he recommended to the club.

Crest

Players

Current squad

Current coaching staff
Manager/Head Coach Johnathan McKinstry

Gor Mahia Fans Foundation
The Gor Mahia Fans Foundation was launched in early 2012 to develop and maintain an effective and influential role for Gor Mahia fans in the running of the football club, and to strengthen the bonds between the club and its community of followers through participation in activities that promote better management and running of the club and those that influence better performance and motivates the playing unit, with all these being made possible by inviting involvement of the fans to take part in the activities to make K'Ogalo better. Its range of plans includes:
 Assisting the club to own its own stadium, training facilities and club house through a fans' trust.
 Assisting the club to establish its own youth system for both genders.
 Establish a Player Reward scheme.
 Partnering with the club to set up proper merchandise enterprises for mutual benefit.

The foundation is currently involved in jointly running, marketing and sourcing for funds for the Gor Mahia under-19 and academy teams, CSR activities for the Gor Mahia family, most notably regular charity events at Children's Oncology Ward for cancer patients at the Kenyatta National Hospital, and jointly organising, marketing and sourcing for funds for the Jerry Onyango Tournament in Ugunja every December to unearth new talents in rural areas.

Honours
African Cup Winners' Cup: 1
1987

CECAFA Clubs Cup: 3
1980, 1981, 1985

Kenyan Premier League: 19
1968, 1974, 1976, 1979, 1983, 1984, 1985, 1987, 1990, 1991, 1993, 1995, 2013, 2014, 2015, 2017, 2018, 2018–19, 2019–20

Kenya Challenge Cup/Moi Golden Cup/Transparency Cup/President's Cup/KFF Cup/FKL Cup/FKF Cup: 9
1981, 1983, 1986, 1987, 1988, 2008, 2011, 2012, 2021

Kenyan Super Cup: 5
2009, 2013 (pre-season), 2015, 2017, 2019

KPL Top 8 Cup: 2
2012, 2015

As Luo Union
Kenyan Premier League: 2
1964, 1975

FA Cup of Kenya: 
1964, 1965, 1966

Performance in CAF competitions
CAF Confederation Cup: 5 appearances
2009 – Preliminary Round
2012 – Preliminary Round
2013 – First Round
2018 – Group Stage
2018-19 – Quarter Finals

CAF Champions League / African Cup of Champions Clubs: 13 appearances

The club have 8 appearances in African Cup of Champions Clubs from 1969 to 1996 and 5 appearances in CAF Champions League from 2014 till now.

1969: Quarter-Finals
1977: Second Round
1980: Second Round
1984: abandoned in Second Round
1991: First Round
1992: Quarter-Finals
1994: First Round
1996: First Round
2014: First Round
2015: First Round
2016: Preliminary Round
2018: First Round
2018-19: First Round
2019-20: First Round

CAF Cup: 2 appearances
1993 – Quarter-Finals
1998 – First Round

CAF Cup Winners' Cup: 7 appearances

1979 – Finalist
1981 – Quarter-Finals
1982 – withdrew in First Round

1983 – Preliminary Round
1987 – Champion
1988 – Quarter-Finals

1989 – Semi-Finals

See also
Gor Mahia F.C.–A.F.C. Leopards rivalry
Gor Mahia winners of the African SportPesa competition organized by SportPesa. Gor Mahia won the championship against Simba FC of Tanzania by thrashing them in a 2–0 victory in the Afraha Stadium in Nakuru.

References

 Official: Gor Mahia names Muguna new captain

External links
 Gor Mahia (archived 24 July 2016)
 
 
 
 

Kenyan Premier League clubs
Football clubs in Kenya
Association football clubs established in 1968
Sport in Nairobi
1968 establishments in Kenya
African Cup Winners Cup winning clubs